"Elephant Stone" is a song by the English rock band the Stone Roses. It was the third single released by the group and their first release on Silvertone Records. Originally released in October 1988, it showcases the group's growing confidence and incorporation of dance rhythms. The song was written by singer Ian Brown and guitarist John Squire. It was inserted as an additional track into the tracklisting of U.S. pressings of the band's debut album in 1989.

Background
The single was produced by New Order bassist Peter Hook in his own studio. It was initially scheduled for release on Rough Trade Records and remixed by John Leckie following a deal with Silvertone Records.

"Elephant Stone" was released in two alternate versions; the original ran for nearly five minutes and featured an extended drum intro and more prominent bass playing, while the later, shorter cut ran for three minutes and included layers of wah-wah guitar. On its original release it failed to make the chart, but reached #8 on re-release in March 1990.

The B-side "Full Fathom Five" (named after a Jackson Pollock painting) is essentially an alternate single mix of "Elephant Stone" played in reverse.

John Squire on the hidden meaning of "Elephant Stone", "What is about? Love and Death... War and Peace... Morecambe and Wise..."
Squire also said about "Elephant Stone", "It's about a girl... who I don't see any more..." The song is said to reference William George Keith Elphinstone and his disastrous retreat from Afghanistan (during which he died) in 1842; the allusion presumably being made that the suitors heartbreak at being dropped by his girlfriend equates to Elphinstone's defeat.

Although released as a non-album single, the track did appear on the US release of the band's debut album The Stone Roses and also on some post-1989 reissued UK editions of the album. It has also appeared on the compilation albums Turns into Stone, The Complete Stone Roses and The Very Best of The Stone Roses.

Track listing

1988 release
7" vinyl (Silvertone ORE 1)
catalogue number in black
 "Elephant Stone" – 3:00
 "The Hardest Thing in the World" – 2:39

12" vinyl (Silvertone ORE T 1)
catalogue number in black
 "Elephant Stone" – 4:51
 "Elephant Stone" (7" version) – 3:00
 "Full Fathom Five" (John Leckie mix) – 2:56
 "The Hardest Thing in the World" – 2:39

1990 reissue
7" vinyl (Silvertone ORE 1)
catalogue number in red
 "Elephant Stone" – 3:00
 "The Hardest Thing in the World" – 2:39

12" vinyl (Silvertone ORE T 1)
catalogue number in red
 "Elephant Stone" – 4:51
 "Elephant Stone" (7" version) – 3:00
 "Full Fathom Five" (John Leckie mix) – 2:56
 "The Hardest Thing in the World" – 2:39

Cassette (Silvertone ORE C 1), CD (Silvertone ORE CD 1)
 "Elephant Stone" – 4:51
 "Full Fathom Five" (longer version) – 3:20
 "The Hardest Thing in the World" – 2:39
 "Elephant Stone" (7" version) – 3:00

Charts

References

External links
The Definitive Stone Roses Discography entry

1988 singles
The Stone Roses songs
Songs written by John Squire
1988 songs
Song recordings produced by John Leckie
Songs written by Ian Brown
UK Independent Singles Chart number-one singles